Frontenac is an unincorporated community and census-designated place (CDP) in Florence Township, Goodhue County, Minnesota, United States, on the Mississippi River. As of the 2010 census, its population was 282.

History
James Wells established a trading post in the location that would become Frontenac before 1850. He dealt mostly with Native Americans until the railroad was built in the early 1870s. In 1854, the Garrard brothers came upon the area during a hunting trip and bought large tracts of land. By 1857, the community was permanently established with the name of Westervelt in 1855 to honor the then postmaster, Evert V. Westervelt.

The name was changed to Frontenac in 1860 by the Garrard brothers after Frenchman, Louis de Buade de Frontenac, who was born in 1622. He was the French colonial governor of Canada in 1672–82 and 1689–98. He died in Quebec, Canada on November 28, 1698. There is not a record of him actually traveling to the Mississippi River.

Frontenac housed a station of the Chicago, Milwaukee, St. Paul and Pacific Railroad and the picturesque scenery soon began attracting wealthy residents. It became a community of summer homes with lakeside views. The railway line outside the community ran from north to south, connected the remote area with larger cities, but it was far enough away from the bluffs not to detract from the vacation destination. There are actually two communities that comprise Frontenac. The railway line attracted some residents, while the bluffs attracted others. The houses along the railway line, and later the highway, became known as Frontenac Station while the bluff residences are called Old Frontenac.  Both are in Florence Township and are listed as one location in the U.S. Census.

Geography

Demographics

The 2010 Census only includes the Frontenac Station part.

At the census of 2010, there were 282 people in 114 households in Frontenac.

Religion
St John Lutheran Church is a Christian church of the Wisconsin Evangelical Lutheran Synod in Frontenac. Christ Episcopal Church is also located in Old Frontenac, and features an outdoor amphitheater.

Attractions

Mount Frontenac Ski and Golf
The Mount Frontenac Ski Resort  was located on the north-western edge of Frontenac Station. The ski runs have been closed and are now part of an 18-hole golf course.

Frontenac State Park
The land between Frontenac Station and Old Frontenac, as well as much of the land to the north and some to the south, was set aside as a State Park in 1957. Frontenac State Park includes the floodplain along the Mississippi River, bluffs which are a flyway for many migratory bird species, prairies and hardwood forests.
It is within the Mississippi Flyway and is also part of the Driftless Area of the north central United States.

Transportation 
Frontenac is located along U.S. Highway 61, which also carries U.S. Highway 63 at that point.

Rail lines run parallel to the highway, but there is no longer a station in Frontenac.

Notable person
John F. Hager, Wisconsin State Assemblyman and businessman, was born in Frontenac.

See also
 Frontenac State Park
 Minnesota Historical Society
 National Register of Historic Places (Goodhue County)

References

Census-designated places in Goodhue County, Minnesota
Census-designated places in Minnesota
Minnesota populated places on the Mississippi River
Historic districts on the National Register of Historic Places in Minnesota
National Register of Historic Places in Goodhue County, Minnesota